Fr. John Brady DD (February 11, 1842 – January 6, 1910) was a Roman Catholic bishop.

Brady was born at Crosserlough, Co. Cavan, Ireland, April 11, 1842. Educated at the local diocesan schools and then completed his theological course at the Missionary College of All Hallows, Dublin, which trained priests for English Speaking communities, where he was ordained priest for the Diocese of Boston, December 4, 1864.
He served as a curate in Boston and at Newburyport until 1868, when he was made pastor at Amesbury. He continued in this charge until he was nominated Titular Bishop of Alabanda and Auxiliary Bishop of Boston appointed on June 19, 1891; he was consecrated August 5, 1891.

He died while still in office on January 6, 1910, after a short illness, his funeral mass was celebrated by Archbishop William O'Connell.

References

1842 births
1910 deaths
Irish emigrants to the United States (before 1923)
Clergy from Boston
Roman Catholic Archdiocese of Boston
20th-century Roman Catholic bishops in the United States
Irish expatriate Catholic bishops
People from County Cavan
Alumni of All Hallows College, Dublin
19th-century Roman Catholic bishops in the United States